Ammatucha longilepigera is a species of snout moth in the genus Ammatucha. It was described by Ren & Li, in 2006, and is known from China.

References

Moths described in 2006
Endemic fauna of China
Phycitini
Moths of Asia